Jack Best may refer to:

 John William Best (1912–2000), British Royal Air Force pilot
 Jack Best (rugby union) (1914–1994), New Zealand rugby union player